Salcomine is a coordination complex derived from the salen ligand and cobalt. The complex, which is planar, and a variety of its derivatives are carriers for O2 as well as oxidation catalysts.

Preparation and structure
Salcomine is commercially available. It may be synthesized from cobalt(II) acetate and salenH2.

Salcomine crystallizes as a dimer. In this form, the cobalt centers achieve five-coordination via a bridging phenolate ligands. A monomeric form crystallizes with chloroform in the lattice.  It features planar Co centers. Salcomine is both a Lewis acid and a reductant. Several solvated derivatives bind O2 to give derivatives of the type (μ-O2)[Co(salen)py]2 and [Co(salen)py(O2)].

Applications

The 1938 report that this compound reversibly bound O2 led to intensive research on this and related complexes for the storage or transport of oxygen. Solvated derivatives of salcomine, e.g. the chloroformate or the DMF adduct, bind 0.5 equivalent of O2:
2 Co(salen) + O2 → [Co(salen)]2O2

Salcomine catalyzes the oxidation of 2,6-disubstituted phenols by dioxygen.

References

Metal salen complexes
Cobalt compounds